The 2022–23 West Virginia Mountaineers men's basketball team represented West Virginia University during the 2022–23 NCAA Division I men's basketball season. The Mountaineers were coached by Bob Huggins, in his 16th season as WVU's head coach, and played their home games at the WVU Coliseum in Morgantown, West Virginia as members of the Big 12 Conference. They finished the season 19–15, 7–11 in Big 12 Play to finish in eighth place. They lost in the quarterfinals of the Big 12 tournament to Kansas. They received an at-large bid to the NCAA tournament as the No. 9 seed in the South region, where they were defeated Maryland in the First Round.

Previous season
The Mountaineers finished the 2021–22 season 16–17, 4–14 in Big 12 play to finish in last place. They defeated Kansas State in the first round of the Big 12 tournament before losing to Kansas in the quarterfinals.

Offseason

Departures

Incoming transfers

Recruiting classes

2022 recruiting class

Roster

Schedule and results 

|-
!colspan=12 style=| Exhibition

|-
!colspan=12 style=| Regular season

|-
!colspan=12 style=| Big 12 tournament

|-
!colspan=12 style=""| NCAA tournament

Source

Rankings

*AP does not release post-NCAA Tournament rankings.

References

West Virginia Mountaineers men's basketball seasons
West Virginia
West Virginia
West Virginia
West Virginia